Us and Them: Symphonic Pink Floyd is an instrumental album of Pink Floyd songs.  The album was arranged by Jaz Coleman, produced by Youth and performed by the London Philharmonic Orchestra conducted by Peter Scholes.

The album cover was painted by Roger Dean who is known for his organic paintings. He also designed albums for Asia, Uriah Heep, and Yes.

The album, which features six songs taken from The Dark Side of the Moon released in 1973 and three from The Wall released in 1979, peaked at number one in the Billboard Magazine Top Classical Crossover Albums chart.

Track listing 
Since the songs are performed by an orchestra, they are somewhat different from the original.  They were, however, composed by the original artist, and all of the songs are arranged by Jaz Coleman.

Chart position

References

Tributes to The Dark Side of the Moon
Tributes to The Wall
Albums with cover art by Roger Dean (artist)
Albums produced by Youth (musician)
London Philharmonic Orchestra albums